Fanta is a brand of fruit-flavored carbonated soft drinks

Fanta may also refer to:

 Fanta (footballer) (born 1966), Brazilian footballer
 Berta Fanta, a Czech intellectual figure
 Josef Fanta, a Czech architect
 Peter Fanta, a USN rear admiral

Given name
 Fanta Damba, Malian singer
 Fanta Dao, Malian runner
 Fanta Diagouraga, Congolese handball player
 Fanta Zara Kamaté, Ivorian footballer
 Fanta Keïta, Senegalese handball player
 Fanta Régina Nacro, Burkinabé film director
 Fanta Sacko, Malian singer
 Fanta Singhateh, Gambian politician
 Fanta Sy, Senegalese footballer